Bentracimab is a monoclonal antibody medication which has been shown in phase one and two clinical trials to function as a reversal agent for the anti–blood clotting drug ticagrelor (which acts as a P2Y12 inhibitor and is sold under the brand name Brilinta among others). It is under investigation for use in major, life-threatening bleeding in patients being treated with ticagrelor. It is not commercially available.

See also 
 Other reversal agents for antithrombotic drugs
 Andexanet alfa
 Ciraparantag
 Vitamin K
 Idarucizumab

References

Antidotes
Monoclonal antibodies